Eduardo Manrique (born 19 April 1965) is a Spanish former cyclist. He competed in the road race at the 1988 Summer Olympics.

References

External links
 

1965 births
Living people
Spanish male cyclists
Olympic cyclists of Spain
Cyclists at the 1988 Summer Olympics
Sportspeople from Valladolid
Cyclists from Castile and León